Arsukibacterium is a Gram-negative, aerobic and motile genus of bacteria from the class Gammaproteobacteria with one known species (Arsukibacterium ikkense).

References

Chromatiales
Bacteria genera
Monotypic bacteria genera
Taxa described in 2016